Capt. Arthur Fancy is a fictional character in the television series NYPD Blue. He was played by James McDaniel from season one through eight.

The fictional character appears in all 167 episodes from the show's 1993 pilot to the 2001 episode depicting his departure. 

Capt. Fancy is the focus of several storylines per season and plays a supporting role in other episodes.

Background

Fancy states in late summer 1995 that he is 42 years old and that he was 41 when his wife gave birth in January 1995, placing his birthday sometime between January and August 1953. He also alluded in season 2 to recently passing his 20-year service mark on the police force, supporting the notion that he joined in 1974 at the minimum age of 21.

Fancy was one of the newer African American commanders on a force previously controlled by Irish American police officers. According to bigoted officer Jack Hanlon during a conversation with John Kelly, the force was up until the 1960s a majority Irish American department with some Italian American and Jewish officers, but only a few African Americans. Fancy's storylines often deal with the challenges of being an African American lieutenant on the NYPD. Fancy commands the respect of both black community activists and the entirely white upper leadership of the NYPD and often acts as a mediator between the two during racially tense investigations. He expresses a pragmatic attitude towards older cops' outdated beliefs - at one point, Fancy tells Andy Sipowicz that he accepts having to manage Sipowicz's racist thought patterns because if Sipowicz were removed from the squad his replacement would inevitably be someone just as bigoted but less competent at the job. At the same time, he maintains a hard line towards overt acts of bigotry. Fancy out-maneuvers the attempts of his superior, Captain Haverill, who flatly believes that there should be no black commanders in the department, to frame him for misconduct and threatens a civil lawsuit over racial discrimination; engineers consequences for the uniformed officer Szymanski for a racially motivated traffic stop; and demands that a victim's father who will not stop yelling racial slurs be removed from the precinct house.

Family
Fancy's wife Lillian is played by Tamara Tunie; they have two daughters when the show begins and a son, Arthur Jr., born during the run of the show. The family also participates in the foster children program. Lillian is diabetic, which causes Fancy to be overprotective during her last pregnancy, for which he later apologizes.

He has a younger brother, a hotheaded uniformed officer named Reggie (played by Michael Jai White) who is distrustful of whites. Reggie's combative behavior draws the ire of his sergeant, a bigot named McNamara who attended the police academy with Fancy. In an attempt to get Reggie fired, McNamara helps a black gypsy cab driver falsely accuse Reggie of taking kickbacks, then suspends him. McNamara innocently claims he is merely following department procedure. Fancy, aware of both McNamara's racism and of his collaboration with the cabbie (Fancy notes the "textbook language" in the written complaint), informed his detectives. They conducted an investigation that revealed Reggie's innocence and McNamara's misdeeds. McNamara had no option but to end his vendetta against Reggie, and Fancy suggested Reggie immediately transfer to another precinct to get away from McNamara. Fancy also used the opportunity to provide Reggie a lesson in professionalism and trust by pointing out that none of the detectives who aided him — Medavoy, Martinez, and Simone — were African-American.

It is revealed in season 6 that Fancy's father was an alcoholic who stole his mother's hard-earned money and died a broken man in the streets, which motivates Fancy to succeed in both his career and family life. His family takes in a foster child named Maceo in season 1, and Fancy is devastated when Maceo's mom, a reformed drug abuser, later returns to reclaim custody. In season 4 when Maceo is arrested for running drugs for his off-the-wagon mom, and Fancy has to convince him to cooperate with the NYPD in a sting against her associates. As Maceo watches from an observation window, his mother blames him and says prison might do him some good. Fancy puts together a deal with the prosecutor that results in Maceo spending a few years on a work farm instead of many years in prison, then counsels him that when he released he will still be young enough to make something good of his life.

Relationship with 15th Precinct commanders
When a borough commander named Haverill (played by James Handy) planned to fabricate reasons to remove Fancy from command, Andy Sipowicz used information about an unsolved organized crime murder to blackmail Haverill into leaving Fancy alone. 

Haverill later started a witch hunt directed at Detective John Kelly, one of Fancy's best detectives. After stoking an investigation based on flimsy allegations, Haverill provoked Kelly into committing an act of insubordination. Now able to discipline Kelly, Haverill assigns him to menial work as a dispatcher. Rather than accept this humiliating demotion, Kelly resigns from the force, much to Fancy's regret.

In another attempt to wreck Fancy's career, Haverill later tried to use one of Fancy's informant to make it appear Fancy was corrupt. Fancy uncovered the plan and got the informant to record Haverill calling Fancy a "nigger". After Fancy and his detectives prevented the robbery of an armored car, Fancy played the recording for Haverill and gave him two choices - early retirement or a civil trial for racial discrimination. Haverill angrily retired option.

Haverill's replacement, Captain Clifford Bass, was a veteran of patrol. He disagreed with Fancy at times, but was always supportive of Fancy and his detectives.

Relationship with Detective Sipowicz

Fancy was one of the characters who most influenced Andy Sipowicz, changing his once openly racist views. Most of Sipowicz's hostility toward Fancy was caused by Sipowicz's troubled past with African Americans stemming from his childhood and early days on the force infiltrating the Black Panther Party. Fancy at the same time had dealt with bigoted white police officers since his days at the police academy and was not easily intimidated by Sipowicz's racist attitudes. 

Fancy and Sipowicz clashed many times throughout the early years, most notably over a racially charged police shooting and Sipowicz's exchange of racist words with a black community activist, but eventually they grew to admire each other's talents. While Andy was often "sure" that Fancy wanted him gone and was working hard to ruin his career in private (when Andy didn't get a promotion to Detective 1st-Grade he had earned on merit, he initially thought Fancy sabotaged his application, but later admitted that the sad truth was that the NYPD top brass loathed Andy for valid reasons), he knew that Fancy was much more likely to SAVE Andy from career suicide, as he did on two occasions where Andy's alcoholism could have (and probably should have) led to him being forced to retire but Fancy gave him chances to pull himself together (which Andy, to his credit, was always able to do).

Despite his bigoted obstinance, Sipowicz respected Fancy as his boss, defending him on numerous occasions, including blackmailing Fancy's superior, Borough Commander Haverill, after Sipowicz suspected that Haverill was planning on transferring Fancy to another precinct because Haverill was an un-subtle racist who wanted a white male to take over the 15th. Fancy made it clear that he respected Sipowicz's investigative talents, refusing to transfer Sipowicz out of the 15th when given the opportunity to. Fancy suspected that transferring Sipowicz would result in his replacement being another bigot (as a message from Fancy's white bosses) who would have a near 0% chance of being anywhere as talented a detective as Andy was. In assessing his detectives for incoming squad commander Tony Rodriguez, Fancy bluntly stated that if a member of his family was killed, he would want Andy to be the lead investigator on the case.

Bayside, Queens incident

In Season 4, Fancy and his wife were stopped at a traffic light and treated in a rough and possibly racist manner by two uniformed police officers in Bayside, Queens.

The following day, Fancy called the officers in, claiming that they had overreacted pulling them over and treating them as if they were suspects in an armed robbery. After questioning the officers, Fancy concluded that he and his wife were pulled over at gunpoint strictly on the basis of their race. The senior officer, Szymanski, vehemently denied pulling them over on the basis of their race and claimed they did that to every suspect as a precaution.

Angered, Fancy went to Captain Bass, requesting that the Chief of Patrol transfer Officer Szymanski out of the predominantly Caucasian precinct of Bayside, Queens. Fancy figured that Szymanski would be forced to both "earn his money" and learn to better interact with African Americans working in a predominantly African American precinct.  Junior Officer McCaslin had only been on the force 10 months, was seated in the passenger's seat of the squad car, and Fancy believed he was merely backing Szymanski, his superior.

Fancy recommended that Szymanski go to a precinct located either in Harlem or Brooklyn North; Szymanski was reassigned to a precinct in Brooklyn's Bedford-Stuyvesant neighborhood. He then came to Fancy, furious over having been reassigned to a "toilet", claiming that Fancy wrongfully abused his power - which Fancy frankly admitted to doing, pointing out, "When you pull someone over, no telling who you're dealing with".

Captain Bass then came to Fancy, telling him that putting Szymanski in Bedford-Stuyvesant was a bad idea — that putting a bigoted police officer in a problematic and predominantly African American precinct would only add to that community's problems and compromise the safety of innocent citizens there.  Fancy realized what Bass was saying was true, and got Szymanski transferred under his command at the 15th precinct, where he was assigned a black partner.

Szymanski later faced false accusations of robbing a black drug dealer and assassinating a Black undercover officer while at the 15th. Fancy nevertheless came through clearing Szymanski of both problems after hearing Szymanski's side of both situations leading to a truce between the two.

Promotion to Captain
After nine successful years as the commander of the 15th Precinct's detective squad, Fancy was promoted to captain. When the 15th Squad discovered that Bass's wife was injuring herself as a means of getting attention, Bass expressed gratitude that they kept the matter from becoming a criminal case or a news story. He retired to care for her and recommended Fancy as his replacement. When the extremely unpopular Lieutenant Susan Dalto was transferred in as his replacement, Fancy called on Bass for one last favor, and Bass had Dalto transferred out. Fancy was replaced by Lieutenant Tony Rodriguez.

References 

Fictional New York City Police Department captains
NYPD Blue characters
Fictional African-American people
Fictional New York City Police Department lieutenants
Television characters introduced in 1993